Haploa colona, the colona moth, is a moth of the family Erebidae. The species was first described by Jacob Hübner in 1802. It is found from south-eastern Virginia south to Florida and west to Texas.

The wingspan is 40–58 mm. The forewings are white with a number of brown markings. The hindwings and abdomen are sulphur yellow.

The larvae feed on a wide range of plants, but mainly deciduous shrubs and trees such as Malus, Fraxinus and Celtis species. They are dark brown to black with large bluish tubercles and broken stripes. They are covered with short black hairs.

Subspecies
Haploa colona colona
Haploa colona fulvicosta (Clemens, 1860) (New Jersey, Kansas, Texas)
Haploa colona conscita (Walker, 1865)

References

Moths described in 1802
Callimorphina